Yazathu (1260 – 10 May 1291) was the only son of King Narathihapate and his chief queen Saw Hla Wun. By birth, Yazathu should have been the heir-presumptive although the chronicles do not specifically mention any heirs apparent during Narathihapate's reign. After the king's death in 1287, Yazathu did not become king. His powerful mother instead placed Kyawswa, a son of Narathihapate by a junior queen, on the throne in 1289. A surviving inscription from 1290 states that the prince and his mother donated a monastery. The prince died in 1291.

References

Bibliography
 

Pagan dynasty
1291 deaths
Year of birth uncertain
13th-century Burmese people